INS Rajali,  is an Indian naval air station located near Arakkonam, Ranipet district, Tamil Nadu in southern India. It operates under the Southern Naval Command of the Indian Navy, and has the longest military runway in Asia.

History
The airfield at Arakkonam was constructed in early 1942, for use by Allies of World War II. The first recorded air operations from the field took place when the No. 2 Squadron of the Royal Indian Air Force, flying Westland Lysander aircraft flew support missions for the British Indian Army between May and Sep 1942.

The airfield was abandoned after the war and lay unused until the 1980s, when it was transferred to the Indian Navy who rehabilitated and commissioned the airfield as INS Rajali. INS Rajali was commissioned on 11 March 1992. The commissioning commanding officer was Captain  RS Vasan, who subsequently retired in the rank of commodore while on deputation to the Coast Guard as the Regional 
Commander of Coast Guard Region East. Rajali, named after a bird, was commissioned by then President R. Venkataraman. The upgraded airbase became home to an anti-submarine warfare squadron, INAS 312, which moved here from INS Hansa in Goa. On 16 April 1988, the Tupolev Tu-142MK-E aircraft were commissioned into the squadron by the then Defence Minister, K. C. Pant, at INS Hansa. The Albatross as they are called celebrated the silver jubilee of induction at Rajali. The replacement aircraft for the TU 142 M are P8i Poseidon and  eight of them have started operating from Rajali. The Helicopter Training School which operated from INS Garuda was shifted to Rajali from July 1991 in the year of commissioning itself and has been training rotary-wing pilots of the Navy and the Coast Guard ever since. This self-contained base celebrated its silver jubilee on 11 March 2017. Boeing will establish a training facility spanning 60,000 sq ft for the P-8I Neptune by 2021.

INS Rajali now spans  and has the longest military runway in Asia.

2015 Floods
During the 2015 South India Floods when Chennai International Airport was closed due to floodwaters, INS Rajali was used as a makeshift airport for relief operations as well as limited commercial flights. Some passengers had been brought from flooded areas by helicopter. Commuter services on the Chennai Suburban Railway were operated from Arakkonam Junction for the benefit of passengers coming by air through Rajali.

Units
INS Rajali is home to the navy's INAS 312 squadron which operates P-8I Neptune

See also
 Indian navy 
 List of Indian Navy bases
 List of active Indian Navy ships

 Integrated commands and units
 Armed Forces Special Operations Division
 Defence Cyber Agency
 Integrated Defence Staff
 Integrated Space Cell
 Indian Nuclear Command Authority
 Indian Armed Forces
 Special Forces of India

 Other lists
 Strategic Forces Command
 List of Indian Air Force stations
 List of Indian Navy bases
 India's overseas military bases

References

Airports in Tamil Nadu
Rajali
1942 establishments in India
Airports established in 1942
1992 establishments in Tamil Nadu
20th-century architecture in India